Ivan Carl Sutherland  (born 15 September 1950) is a former New Zealand rower who won an Olympic bronze medal. At the 1976 Summer Olympics in Montreal, he crewed the eight along Tony Hurt, Alec McLean, Trevor Coker, Peter Dignan, Lindsay Wilson, Joe Earl and Dave Rodger and Simon Dickie (cox). The 1977 World Rowing Championships saw Sutherland win silver in the coxless four with Des Lock, David Lindstrom and Dave Rodger under new coach Harry Mahon. Sutherland was also the rowing team manager for New Zealand at the 1988 Summer Olympics in Seoul and the 1992 Summer Olympics in Barcelona. He was subsequently a national rowing selector.

In the 2011 Queen's Birthday Honours, Sutherland was appointed a Member of the New Zealand Order of Merit, for services to rowing and viticulture.

References

External links
 
 
 

1950 births
Living people
Members of the New Zealand Order of Merit
New Zealand male rowers
Olympic rowers of New Zealand
Olympic bronze medalists for New Zealand
Rowers at the 1976 Summer Olympics
Olympic medalists in rowing
World Rowing Championships medalists for New Zealand
Medalists at the 1976 Summer Olympics
Sportspeople from Blenheim, New Zealand